Funen is one of the 12 multi-member constituencies of the Folketing, the national legislature of Denmark. The constituency was established in 2007 following the public administration structural reform. It consists of the municipalities of Ærø, Assens, Faaborg-Midtfyn, Kerteminde, Langeland, Middelfart, Nordfyn, Nyborg, Odense and Svendborg. The constituency currently elects 12 of the 179 members of the Folketing using the open party-list proportional representation electoral system. At the 2022 general election it had 378,832 registered electors.

Electoral system
Funen currently elects 12 of the 179 members of the Folketing using the open party-list proportional representation electoral system. Constituency seats are allocated using the D'Hondt method. Compensatory seats are calculated based on the national vote and are allocated using the Sainte-Laguë method, initially at the provincial level and finally at the constituency level. Only parties that reach any one of three thresholds stipulated by section 77 of the Folketing (Parliamentary) Elections Act - winning at least one constituency seat; obtaining at least the Hare quota (valid votes in province/number of constituency seats in province) in two of the three provinces; or obtaining at least 2% of the national vote - compete for compensatory seats.

Election results

Summary

(Excludes compensatory seats)

Detailed

2022
Results of the 2022 general election held on 1 November 2022:

Votes per municipality:<

The following candidates were elected:
 Constituency seats - Kim Aas (A), 2,337 votes; Sara Emil Baaring (A), 5,247 votes; Erling Bonnesen (V), 11,572 votes; Trine Bramsen (A), 6,456 votes; Bjørn Brandenborg (A), 11,167 votes; Jens Henrik Thulesen Dahl (Æ), 2,210 votes; Katrine Daugaard (I), 2,861 votes; Rosa Eriksen (M), 4,469 votes; Karsten Hønge (F), 5,215 vots; Thomas Skriver Jensen (A), 3,726 votes; Dan Jørgensen (A), 8,256 votes; and Lars Christian Lilleholt (V), 9,796 votes.
 Compensatory seats - Alex Ahrendtsen (O), 1,477 votes; Mikkel Bjørn (D), 888 votes; Mai Mercado (C), 4,426 votes; and Victoria Velasquez (Ø), 6,676 votes.

2019
Results of the 2019 general election held on 5 June 2019:

Votes per municipality:

The following candidates were elected:
 Constituency seats - Marlene Ambo-Rasmussen (V), 12,301 votes; Erling Bonnesen (V), 15,513 votes; Trine Bramsen (A), 19,903 votes; Bjørn Brandenborg (A), 11,144 votes; Jens Henrik Thulesen Dahl (O), 2,913 votes; Karsten Hønge (F), 4,146 vots; Jan Johansen (A), 12,012 votes; Dan Jørgensen (A), 28,885 votes; Lars Christian Lilleholt (V), 19,394 votes; Mai Mercado (C), 13,494 votes; Rasmus Helveg Petersen (B), 3,763 votes; and Victoria Velasquez (Ø), 7,233 votes.
 Compensatory seats - Alex Ahrendtsen (O), 2,656 votes; Jane Heitmann (V), 8,004 votes; and Julie Skovsby (A), 7,512 votes.

2015
Results of the 2015 general election held on 18 June 2015:

Votes per municipality:

The following candidates were elected:
 Constituency seats - Alex Ahrendtsen (O), 13,702 votes; Pernille Bendixen (O), 9,524 votes; Erling Bonnesen (V), 15,857 votes; Trine Bramsen (A), 16,666 votes; Erik Christensen (A), 8,024 votes; Jens Henrik Thulesen Dahl (O), 26,753 votes; Jane Heitmann (V), 8,307 votes; Jan Johansen (A), 18,894 votes; Dan Jørgensen (A), 29,333 votes; Lars Christian Lilleholt (V), 15,705 votes; Merete Riisager (I), 16,481 votes; and Pernille Skipper (Ø), 13,895 votes.
 Compensatory seats - Karsten Hønge (F), 5,015 vots; Rune Lund (Ø), 1,758 votes; Roger Matthisen(Å), 5,109 votes; Mai Mercado (C), 8,275 votes; Julie Skovsby (A), 7,598 votes; and Dorthe Ullemose (O), 7,148 votes.

2011
Results of the 2011 general election held on 15 September 2011:

Votes per municipality:

The following candidates were elected:
 Constituency seats - Alex Ahrendtsen (O), 6,983 votes; Anne Baastrup (F), 12,569 votes; Erling Bonnesen (V), 16,239 votes; Trine Bramsen (A), 8,464 votes; Jens Henrik Thulesen Dahl (O), 14,961 votes; Jakob Ellemann-Jensen (V), 17,095 votes; Carsten Hansen (A), 15,470 votes; Camilla Hersom (B), 14,769 votes; Jan Johansen (A), 7,982 votes; Lars Christian Lilleholt (V), 23,111 votes; Pernille Rosenkrantz-Theil (A), 32,337 votes; Pernille Skipper (Ø), 5,777 votes; 
 Compensatory seats - Jane Heitmann (V), 8,535 votes; Mai Henriksen (C), 7,213 votes; Merete Riisager (I), 8,141 votes; Julie Skovsby (A), 7,489 votes; and Annette Vilhelmsen (F), 5,782 votes.

2007
Results of the 2007 general election held on 13 November 2007:

Votes per municipality:

The following candidates were elected:
 Constituency seats - Poul Andersen (A), 10,234 votes; Anne Baastrup (F), 23,011 votes; Bendt Bendtsen (C), 33,026 votes; Erling Bonnesen (V), 21,028 votes; Jens Henrik Thulesen Dahl (O), 35,865 votes; Carsten Hansen (A), 19,152 votes; Britta Schall Holberg (V), 7,458 votes; Karsten Hønge (F), 5,996 votes; Lars Christian Lilleholt (V), 17,525 votes; Tina Petersen (O), 3,568 votes; Niels Sindal (A), 12,061 votes; Julie Skovsby (A), 15,520 votes;
 Compensatory seats - Vivi Kier (C), 3,022 votes; and Niels Helveg Petersen (B), 8,211 votes.

References

Folketing constituencies
Folketing constituencies established in 2007
Folketing constituency